Ashford may refer to:

Places

Australia
Ashford, New South Wales
Ashford, South Australia
Electoral district of Ashford, South Australia

Ireland
Ashford, County Wicklow
Ashford Castle, County Galway

United Kingdom
Ashford, Kent, a town
Borough of Ashford, a local government district in Kent
Ashford (UK Parliament constituency), Kent
Ashford International railway station
Ashford, North Devon, near Barnstaple (a civil parish)
Ashford, South Hams, Devon, near Kingsbridge, in Aveton Gifford parish
Ashford, Surrey (formerly Middlesex)
Ashford Hill, Hampshire
Ashford-in-the-Water, Derbyshire
Ashford Carbonell, Shropshire

United States
Ashford, Alabama
Ashford Mill, California
Ashford, Connecticut
Ashford, New York
Ashford, Texas
Ashford, Washington
Ashford, Wisconsin, a town
Ashford (community), Wisconsin, an unincorporated community
Ashford, Richland County, Wisconsin, a ghost town
 Ashford University, Clinton, Iowa

Other uses
Ashford (surname)
ST Ashford, a tugboat